Almens (Romansh: Almen) is a former municipality in the district of Hinterrhein in the Swiss canton of Graubünden.  On 1 January 2015 the former municipalities of Almens, Paspels, Pratval, Rodels and Tomils merged to form the new municipality of Domleschg.

History
Almens is first mentioned in the first half of the 9th Century as de Lemenne.

Geography

Of this area, 33.9% is used for agricultural purposes, while 45.5% is forested. Of the rest of the land, 1.7% is settled (buildings or roads) and the remainder (19%) is non-productive (rivers, glaciers or mountains).

The former municipality is located in the Domleschg sub-district of the Hinterrhein district.  It is located on a high terrace above the right bank of the Hinterrhein.  It consists of the village of Almens and the hamlet of Mulegns.

Demographics
Almens had a population (as of 2013) of 228.  , 1.4% of the population was made up of foreign nationals.  Over the last 10 years the population has grown at a rate of 5.2%.

, the gender distribution of the population was 47.5% male and 52.5% female.  The age distribution, in Almens is; 25 people or 11.5% of the population are between 0 and 9 years old.  10 people or 4.6% are 10 to 14, and 15 people or 6.9% are 15 to 19.  Of the adult population, 18 people or 8.3% of the population are between 20 and 29 years old.  34 people or 15.7% are 30 to 39, 42 people or 19.4% are 40 to 49, and 31 people or 14.3% are 50 to 59.  The senior population distribution is 10 people or 4.6% of the population are between 60 and 69 years old, 18 people or 8.3% are 70 to 79, there are 12 people or 5.5% who are 80 to 89, and there are 2 people or 0.9% who are 90 to 99.

In the 2007 federal election the most popular party was the SPS which received 38.8% of the vote.  The next three most popular parties were the SVP (26.5%), the FDP (23%) and the CVP (9.5%).

In Almens about 76.1% of the population (between age 25-64) have completed either non-mandatory upper secondary education or additional higher education (either university or a Fachhochschule).

Almens has an unemployment rate of 0.33%.  , there were 15 people employed in the primary economic sector and about 6 businesses involved in this sector.  1 person is employed in the secondary sector and there is 1 business in this sector.  11 people are employed in the tertiary sector, with 5 businesses in this sector.

The historical population is given in the following table:

Languages
Almens used to belong to the Romansh-speaking part of Graubünden, but today it is practically completely German-speaking.  , 95.9% of the population speaks German, with Romansh being second most common ( 2.8%) and Italian being third ( 0.5%).

References

Notes

External links
Official Web site

Former municipalities of Graubünden
Populated places disestablished in 2015
2015 disestablishments in Switzerland
Domleschg